Pahala Bomiriya B Grama Niladhari Division is a Grama Niladhari Division of the Kaduwela Divisional Secretariat  of Colombo District  of Western Province, Sri Lanka .  It has Grama Niladhari Division Code 472B.

Pahala Bomiriya B is a surrounded by the Wekewatta, Welihinda, Kaduwela, Korathota, Nawagamuwa and Pahala Bomiriya  Grama Niladhari Divisions.

Demographics

Ethnicity 

The Pahala Bomiriya B Grama Niladhari Division has a Sinhalese majority (96.2%) . In comparison, the Kaduwela Divisional Secretariat (which contains the Pahala Bomiriya B Grama Niladhari Division) has a Sinhalese majority (95.6%)

Religion 

The Pahala Bomiriya B Grama Niladhari Division has a Buddhist majority (94.9%) . In comparison, the Kaduwela Divisional Secretariat (which contains the Pahala Bomiriya B Grama Niladhari Division) has a Buddhist majority (90.4%)

Grama Niladhari Divisions of Kaduwela Divisional Secretariat

References